List by Family Name: A - B - C - D - E - F - G - H - I - J - K - M - N - O - R - S - T - U - W - Y - Z

 Reischauer Haru (1915–1998)
 Renjo Mikihiko (1948–2013)
 Ryōgo Narita (born 1980)
 Ryōkan (1758–1831)
 Ryo Mizuno (born 1963)

R